Thapathali Campus also known as Thapathali Engineering Campus is one of the five constituent engineering campuses under Institute of Engineering (IOE), of Tribhuvan University (TU). Located at the center of Kathmandu city, the campus was established in 2023 B.S. to develop middle level manpower in the field in different fields engineering which upgraded its programs to bachelor and master level along the course of time. Being roughly about 1.25 km from the central campus Pulchowk Campus, it remains the second most demanded engineering campus in Nepal after Pulchowk Campus. 

It is a governmental college and funded by the Government of Nepal. Students who have passed an entrance exam conducted by IOE are allowed to apply for admission. Students are admitted by priority selection according to their score in IOE entrance exam. The campus only takes 432 students from about 15,000 candidates, which roughly estimates the acceptance rate to be 2.88%. Similarly, total Intake in Master Level is 60 Students per year.

Location 
Thapathali Campus is in Thapathali, at the heart of Kathmandu city.

History 
In the presence of Late King Mahendra, Late Dr. Heinrich lubk, President of Federal Republic of Germany inaugurated Technical Institute (TTI) on 29th of Falgun 2023 B.S. The Technical Training Institute(TTI) offered mid-level manpower course in mechanical engineering, automobile engineering, electrical engineering and mechanical drafting beginning. With the assistance from the Government of Federal republic of Germany, Technical Training Institute Project (TTIP) was established in Nepal in 2019 B.S., with the sole objective of producing trained trade persons and technicians needed for the development of the country. TTI started three years vocational training in mechanical, automobile and electrical trades for S.L.C. graduates from 2022 B.S. to 2024 B.S. At the meantime, the three years course in mechanical drafting was transferred to Pulchowk, IOE.

From 2029 B.S. this Technical Training Institute (TTI) was renamed as Thapathali Campus under Tribhuvan University (T.U.) and known as Institute of Engineering, Thapathali Campus thereafter. Campus started diploma in mechanical engineering and diploma in automobile engineering 2043 B.S. and later on, diploma in electronics engineering and diploma computer engineering started from 2058 B.S.

According to the policy of Institute of Engineering (IOE), campus introduce bachelor in Industrial engineering in 2062 B.S., bachelor in Civil engineering in 2066 B.S., bachelor in electronics and communication engineering in 2067 B.S., bachelor in mechanical engineering in 2068 B.S., by stopping new intakes in any diploma courses from 2070 B. S. Again, Campus has intake bachelor in architecture and master in earthquake engineering in 2071 B.S., bachelor in automobile engineering in 2072 B.S. and master in mechanical design & manufacturing in 2073 B.S. also.

The existing infrastructures, human resources moreover fulfill the requirement of diploma level courses. There is an utmost need of renovation restructuring the existing infrastructures and human resources to stabilize the bachelor programs and also to address the growing demands. To sustain the restructuring and complete it, and to aggressively move forward to achieve higher levels of excellence with the intent of becoming one of the engineering campus in the nation, a comprehensive restructuring document is necessary. Creating a plan involves listening to many ideas from stake holders, assembling the ideas into a framework that support the mission and vision of the campus.

The Future Plan 
This Campus is constructed on 32 ropanis of land, which is not fully sufficient for an Engineering Campus. So, the campus was seeking for land for additional Programs. Now, Nepal Government, Ministry of Physical Infrastructure & Transportation have planned to construct fly over bridge from Maitighar to Tripureswor above Thapathali campus. So the campus has to shift to another place.

In this regard, Campus has demanded land with Tribhuvan University near Ring Road, Balkhu. It has submitted proposal demanding 250 ropani land. It is under process. After the decision of TU, the campus is developing & constructing the infrastructures in Balkhu near TU.

Courses 
The courses offered by Thapathali Campus are as follows:

Bachelors 

 Civil Engineering (B.C.E) 
 Computer Engineering (B.C.T) 
 Electronics, Communication and Information Engineering (B.E.I)
 Mechanical Engineering (B.M.E) 
 Industrial Engineering (B.I.E)
 Automobile Engineering (B.AM.E) 

 Bachelor in Architecture (B.Arch)

Masters

 Master of Science (M. Sc.) Engineering in Mechanical Design and Manufacturing
 Master of Science (M.Sc.) Engineering in Earthquake Engineering
 Master of Science (M.Sc.) in Informatics and Intelligent Systems Engineering

Departments 

 Department of Automobile & Mechanical Engineering

 Department of Industrial Engineering

 Department of Civil Engineering
 Department of Electronics & Communication Engineering
 Department of Architecture
 Department of Applied Science

Journal of Innovation in Engineering Education 

The Journal of Innovation in Engineering Education is an open access peer-reviewed scientific journal, trying to provide a national and international platform for important scientific discussion related to engineering and technology. It seeks to publish original research paper of scientific quality with aim to provide archival resources for researchers from all engineering backgrounds.  The journal considers articles in the form of research article, review article and short commentary. It is published annually from Institute of Engineering, Thapathali Campus. This journal accepts research articles from all engineering fields.

College facilities 
The college premises spreading approx. in 4 acres, consists of several buildings for classes and laboratories of engineering/architecture faculties. It is also one of the engineering colleges in the country with well-equipped labs and facilities. The college remains main campus for Automobile and Industrial engineering.

Thapathali Campus Library is one of the most advanced libraries of Nepal with the facilities of its autonomous website where the books can be discovered and kept on hold.

Free Student's Union (FSU) 
The campus FSU is won by Nepal Student Union and is led by Pushkar Bikram Shahi.

Student society  
Thapathali Campus Everyone (TCE), Thapathali (Join by clicking here )

Thapathali Campus Everyone(TCE) is a facebook community for students and alumni of Thapathali Campus. Students can interact with other friends inside the campus through this group. This group was established by the students of batch 2078. It's a nice place for all of students to share their quality time with  future and senior engineering friends. 

Thapathali Chess Club (TCC), Thapathali

Thapathali Chess Club (TCC) at Thapathali Campus was established in 2070 BS with the sole intention of uniting chess lovers from entire campus with a motto "Chess for all". TCC has been able to perform various remarkable chess competitions. TCC , being inactive during the time of 2070 - 2077 BS , was again brought back to life by some of chess enthusiast inside the campus in year 2078. TCC won first ever NATIONAL INTER-COLLEGE CHESS COMPETITION in 2078 BS with exciting prize pool of NRS. 40,000. TCC aims to conduct more chess events in the campus and unite everyone from different background with the aura of chess. 

Robotics and Automation Center (RAC), Thapathali

Robotics and Automation Center (RAC) at Thapathali Campus was established in 2062 BS with

the initiation of a few students of diploma level with the support of campus. RAC was primely

established to provide a platform for students to practice and learn practical skills related to

robotics. Robotics is a common area for multidisciplinary students carrying the common goal of

practicing robotics. RAC now includes students from electronics, mechanical, automobile,

industrial, and architecture backgrounds with a common goal of pursuing robotics.

Civil Engineering Student Society (CESS), Thapathali 
Civil Engineering Student Society (CESS), Thapathali, is a community of civil engineering students founded with a motto-"Engineering for Purpose". Established in 2071 B.S. at Thapathali Campus, CESS has been able to perform various remarkable activities. We are completely a non-profit organization. We neither discuss any political ideas nor promote any political views. We help all the civil engineering students become a better future engineers by encouraging them to understand and implement what they learn.

Society of Industrial Engineering Students (SOIES) 
Society of Industrial Engineering Students - Nepal is a student-driven dynamic society dedicated solely to the support of the Industrial Engineering scholars, bring meaningful collaborations with the industrial stakeholders, professions and individuals involved with improving quality, productivity, technology, industrial success and prosperity, thereby making a fundamental contribution to the creation of wealth. We incubate leadership, explore collaborative possibilities, and lead Innovative vision through industrial engineering discipline to be followed in mainstream of sustainable development.

Nepal Terai Bidhyarthi Sangh(NTBS) 
Nepal Terai Bidhyarthi Sangh(NTBS) is a non-political organization in Thapathali Engineering Campus which was established in 2056 BS. This organization has been conducting various skillful and tutorial classes which are very beneficial for the personal and engineering development.

One of the major program “SARASWATI POOJA” which is organized each and every year in thapathali campus since established. But this year we are adding cultural program which is going to attract much more people.

The main objective of this committee is keep unity in students from all over Nepal by doing various awareness and skillful training program. The “SARASWATI POOJA” is one of the huge and best program organized by this committee.

Electronics Community Amidst Students Of Thapathali (ECAST) 
Electronics Community Amidst Students’ Of Thapathali (ECAST) is legally registered non-profitable and non-political organization dedicated to the support and upliftment of Electronics Engineering Students and scholars, which acts as bridge between the rapidly changing technology in world and its impacts, necessity in Nepal. Electronics Community Amidst Students’ Of Thapathali (ECAST) is an organization that provides leadership for the application, education and training for the development of electronics engineering students and endeavors to create a significant collaboration of the Electronics Engineering students with the technology that will improve the limitation of technology in Nepal. To increase the creativity of the students and upliftment of the department ECAST has been doing technology related program since its establishment.”

Automobile and Mechanical Engineering Students' Innovative Nexus(AMESIN) 
Established in 2013 and reformed in 2016, AMESIN is a non-profit organization run by a dynamic group of Automobile and Mechanical Engineering students of Thapathali Campus, IOE. We, through this group teach, inform, update and engage students into inculcating technology into their studies and finally lives enabling them the benefits and luxury of modern technology. Though AMESIN is formed by automobile and mechanical engineering students of Thapathali campus, we encourage students from every field interested can join this community. We believe in the fact that " together we can make a big difference."

See also 
 Tribhuvan University
 Kathmandu University
 Pokhara University
 Mid-western University

References

External links
 Institute of Engineering
 Thapathali Campus, IOE
 Pulchok Campus, IOE
 Pashchimanchal Campus, IOE
 Purwanchal Campus, IOE

Engineering universities and colleges in Nepal
Tribhuvan University
1966 establishments in Nepal